Birilyussky District is an administrative and municipal district (raion), one of the forty-three in Krasnoyarsk Krai, Russia. It is located in the southwest of the krai and borders with Yeniseysky District in the north, Pirovsky District in the northeast, Bolshemurtinsky and Yemelyanovsky Districts in the east, Bolsheuluysky and Kozulsky Districts in the south, and with Tyukhtetsky District in the west. Its administrative center is the rural locality (a selo) of Novobirilyussy. Population:  13,090 (2002 Census);  The population of Novobirilyussy accounts for 37.9% of the district's total population.

History
The district was founded on April 4, 1924.

Government
As of 2013, the Head of the District and Chairman of the District Council is Vladimir V. Belenya.

Education
There are twenty-two schools in the district, including nine secondary schools, two junior secondary schools, and eleven primary schools. In Novobirilyussy, there is also a correctional boarding school.

Other educational facilities include five pre-school centers, a youth activity center, youth sports club "Ares", and Professional Lyceum #40, which trains tractor maintenance technicians, agricultural equipment technicians, machinists, drivers, and tractor operators.

Public health services
Medical services in the district are provided by the 95-bed Central District Hospital, 20-bed local hospital, and by 23 medical and obstetric centers.

References

Notes

Sources

Districts of Krasnoyarsk Krai
States and territories established in 1924